Faroese Braille is the braille alphabet of the Faroese language.  It has the same basic letter assignments as the Scandinavian Braille and is quite similar to the Icelandic Braille.

All base letters are as in International Braille (meaning the French Braille alphabet, as that was the first one created). The letters are also the same as the other Nordic Braille alphabets, just as they are in the normal printed Nordic alphabets. For example, å/á, ö/ø and ä/æ are the same letters not only in Braille between, say, Faroese and Swedish Braille, but also recognized as the same characters between, for example, ink-printed Norwegian and Swedish (it is merely a stylistic choice in which language uses which). That is to say, all letter assignments in the Swedish and Icelandic Braille alphabets are the same in the Faroese one.

For example, ð is the same letter in both Faroese and Icelandic ink-print characters, and their Braille alphabets. The difference in the alphabets comes only in the Faroese diphthongs (ei being 26, ey 356, oy 24 – that is to say, "ei" is represented by one dot filled in, in the second row of the first column and the third row of the second column of a Braille character). These diphthongs are also considered single sounds when spelling Faroese in general, as in, it always would be spelled "ey" instead of "e-y" and the two letters cannot be separated. These assignments conveniently do not exist in the Icelandic Braille alphabet, so they are an easy way to tell if the Braille is Faroese or Icelandic. Likewise, the Icelandic letter þ (which no longer exists in Faroese) is assigned to 1246, which is a character that does not exist already in the Faroese Braille alphabet. Summarized, it is just as easy to read Icelandic Braille if one is a Faroese-speaker, as it is to read Icelandic ink-printed text if one can read Faroese.

Punctuation

The apostrophe, is also used as the mark of abbreviations, while  is used as a period / full stop.

Formatting

References

French-ordered braille alphabets
Faroese language